Royal Antwerp Football Club, often referred to as Royal Antwerp or simply Antwerp, is a Belgian football club based in the city of Antwerp. Founded around 1880 as Antwerp Cricket Club by English students residing in Antwerp, 15 years before the creation of the Royal Belgian Football Association, Antwerp is regarded as the oldest club in Belgium. At first there was no organised football played by its members, until 1887 when the football division was founded with an own board, named Antwerp Football Club. Being the oldest active club at the time, it was the first club to register to the Association in 1895. Consequently, when matriculation numbers were introduced in 1926, the club received matriculate number one.

History
Over the course of the club's history, Royal Antwerp have won four Belgian league titles as well as three Belgian Cups.  In 1900, most of the players left the club for the new neighbouring club of K. Beerschot V.A.C., and this was the start of a long rivalry between both clubs.

The club is the most recent Belgian team to have reached a UEFA competition final, the 1993 European Cup Winners' Cup Final, where they lost 3–1 against Parma at Wembley Stadium.

Royal Antwerp had a long-term partnership with the English club Manchester United, taking their young players on loan so that their development can be aided with first team football, and young players who require European work-permits can benefit from Belgium's more relaxed laws. An example is Dong Fangzhuo, who was unable to play for United immediately due to work permit problems and was loaned to allow him to gain first team experience.

Despite being one of Belgium's best-supported clubs, Antwerp have been under-achievers for several years.  They have not won a league title since 1957, and have spent several seasons in the second division.  They were promoted to the top flight in 2000, only to be relegated in short order in 2004. They returned to the first division after 13 years in 2017.

In August 2020, the Great Old won their first major trophy in nearly 30 years when they upset league champions Club Brugge in the final of the Belgian Cup.

On 21 March 2022 Marc Overmars was announced as Royal Antwerp's Director of Football, just over a month after having resigned from the same position at Ajax due to admitting to sending inappropriate messages and pictures of his genitals to female colleagues. His arrival caused four club sponsors to withdraw within a week.

Stadium
Royal Antwerp have played their home matches at the Bosuilstadion since 1923.

Rivalries

Royal Antwerp share a fierce rivalry with city neighbours Beerschot A.C. (now K Beerschot VA). Although in the 2000s-2010s the two clubs have met sparingly, when they do, there is usually fan violence. Royal Antwerp are often seen as a culture club with a diverse, cross-class support across the city while Beerschot have either heavily working class or upper class support, locally based in South Antwerp. Beerschot supporters often refer to RAFC fans as "joden"  or "Jews" due to the fact that to get to Antwerp's stadium they must pass through the Jewish district, while Great Old supporters refer to Beerschot followers as "the rats".

RAFC also have developed a long-standing rivalry with Club Brugge. They also have a local rivalry with KV Mechelen, although there is mutual respect due to a shared hatred of Beerschot.

Meuse/Scheldt Cup
The best football players of Antwerp and Rotterdam contested a yearly match between 1909 and 1959 for the Meuse- and Scheldt Cup (Maas- en Schelde Beker). It was agreed to play the game at Antwerp's stadium De Bosuil in Belgium and at Sparta Rotterdam's Het Kasteel stadium in the Netherlands. The cup was provided in 1909 by P. Havenith from Antwerp and Kees van Hasselt from Rotterdam.

Honours

National
Belgian First Division
Champions: 1928–29, 1930–31, 1943–44, 1956–57

Belgian Second Division
Champions: 1999–2000, 2016–17

Belgian Cup
Winners: 1954–55, 1991–92, 2019–20
Runners-up: 1974–75

Belgian Super Cup
Runners-up: 1992

International

Challenge International du Nord
Winners: 1902, 1906

European Cup Winners' Cup
 Runners-up: 1992–93

Players

Current squad

Other players under contract

Out on loan

Technical staff

Former players

Manchester United Players loan partnership
This is a list of former players acquired on-loan via Manchester United's partnership with Royal Antwerp from 1998 to 2013.

  Jamie Wood
  Dong Fangzhuo
  Fraizer Campbell
  Luke Chadwick
  John Cofie
  Jimmy Davis
  Sylvan Ebanks-Blake
  Adam Eckersley
  David Fox
  Luke Giverin
  Colin Heath
  Tom Heaton
  Kirk Hilton
  Eddie Johnson
  Ritchie Jones
  Michael Lea
  Lee Martin
  Paul Rachubka
  Ryan Shawcross
  Danny Simpson
  Alan Tate
  Ronnie Wallwork
  Neil Wood
  Arthur Gómez
  Danny Higginbotham
  Darron Gibson
  John O'Shea
  Gyliano van Velzen
  Craig Cathcart
  Jonny Evans
  Phil Bardsley
  David Gray
  Souleymane Mamam

See also
Club of Pioneers

References

External links

 
Association football clubs established in 1880
Football clubs in Belgium
Football clubs in Antwerp
1880 establishments in Belgium
Belgian Pro League clubs